Iran participated in the 1996 Asian Winter Games held in Harbin, China from February 4, 1996 to February 11, 1996.

Competitors

Results by event

Skiing

Alpine

Men

Women

References

External links
 Official Website of the Olympic Council of Asia

Asian Winter Games
Nations at the 1996 Asian Winter Games
1996